Sookmyung Women’s University is a private university in Yongsan-gu, Seoul, South Korea. Founded in 1906, Sookmyung is Korea’s first royal private educational institution for women. The university's name is derived from the Hanja characters of sook and Myung, which mean "elegant" and "bright" respectively. With its more than a century-long legacy and history, Sookmyung is renowned as one of the best women's universities nationwide. According to JoongAng Daily's 2018 university rankings, it has been ranked as the second-best women's university in Korea and is ranked nr. 20 on South Korea's list of best universities.

Sookmyung Women's University has distinguished alumni in media, journalism, politics, governments, and academia. It has a highly acclaimed ROTC program. In 2009, The Republic of Korea's Defense Ministry chose Sookmyung Women's University as South Korea's first university to operate a Reserve Officers' Training Corps program for women.
In addition, Sookmyung's ROTC program has been evaluated as the highest ranking ROTC program for women in the 2012 national military training exercises.

Sookmyung Hospitality Business School has been recognized for its excellence by the Ministry of Education Science and Technology since 2007. Le Cordon Bleu Hospitality MBA course, which has a partnership with Le Cordon Bleu, specializes in educating women for future roles in hospitality industries such as Hotel/Restaurant (H1), Travel/ Transportation (H2), Culture/Entertainment/Sports/Hospital (H3), and Service Management (H4).

Timeline 
1906 'Myungshin Girls' School' established by Imperial Consort Sunheon.
1948 Re-established as ‘Sookmyung Women's College'.
1955 Raised to 'University' status.
1995 Establishment of General Development Plan for 2006, the 100th anniversary of the school's foundation, and the second founding of the school.
1996~2002 Selected for six consecutive years as an outstanding university for its efforts in education reform.
1998 Received the Presidential Award for the Best Educational Institution in information.
1999~2001 Selected for three consecutive years as the best university in the survey of Nation's Customer Satisfaction Index (NCSI). 
2000 The first Korean university to receive ISO 14001.
2003 Completion of the Renaissance Plaza and the Second Foundation Campus.
2004 Chung Young Yang Embroidery Museum inaugurated.
2004~2005 Chosen by the Ministry of Education & Human Resources Development in the University Specialization Supporting Program in 2004 and 2005.
2005 Sookmyung Women's Disease Research Center was designated as a new Superior Research Center (SRC) by the Ministry of Science Technology.
2006 Established "Le Cordon Bleu Hospitality MBA.”        The 100th anniversary of Sookmyung's foundation.
2007 'S Leadership Program' is born.
2008 Selected as an outstanding university for its performance in IT Capacity-Building Project of Computer Science major by the Ministry of Education, Science and Technology.
2009 Won the 'Management Innovation Awards'
Selected as the major university leading admission officer system by Ministry of Education, Science and Technology.
2010 Won the 'Chosun Daily News Advertisement Awards.’

Campus 
Sookmyung Women's University consists of a Main Campus and a Second Foundation Campus. The Main Campus is in a beautiful setting in harmony with nature. The Second Foundation Campus, constructed upon the second founding and declaration of the university, is the cultural center of the university and home to the 'S Leadership Program'. The Renaissance Plaza, which has become a landmark, symbol and hub of Sookmyung Women's University, features cultural attractions and activities.

Academic programs

General Education for Leadership
First-year students automatically become part of the Division of General Education for Leadership.

Sookmyung Women's university has a global cooperation department. In the department there are global cooperation and entrepreneurship majors. Officially, all classes in the department are taught in English. However, depending on the English skills of professors, exceptions apply.

Currently, Sookmyung Women's University coordinates with the government's Small and medium Business Administration (SBA) to provide high quality business education. According to the government report only six top schools were selected to cooperate with the SBA — Seoul National University, POSTECH, KAIST, Hanyang University and Inha University.

Mentor program
A reinvigorated mentoring program helps facilitate successful career launches for graduates and prepares them with core job-related abilities for professional work. In addition, Sookmyung's wide-ranging and practical education system provides broad industry-academic cooperation that offers students diverse career choices and on-the-job training opportunities.

Dual degree program
Sookmyung Women's University is the first Korean university to offer a dual degree program that allows students to earn degrees from two institutions. Students are exposed to more comprehensive and integrative approaches to their majors by studying four semesters at each school.

Academic rank
According to JoongAng Daily's 2018 university rankings, Sookmyung Women's University is the second best women's university in Korea and is ranked nr. 20 on South Korea's list of best universities.

Admission is selective. General CSAT scores for admission is two level 1 and one level 2 in language, mathematics; foreign language criteria and two level 1 in rest.

SNOW 2.0 Internet-based open knowledge platform
SNOW (Sookmyung Network to Open World) is an open knowledge platform for sharing higher intellectual content. In February 2010, preparing for an official launch in March, SNOW provides its users with intellectual movie clips, including regular lectures from MIT, Wharton School, Stanford, UC Berkeley, and other higher education institutes. With lectures on humanities, science, and design to great addresses given by global leaders, SNOW offers Korean scripts and an introduction to those academic data and encourages its users to participate as volunteers. They can help the intellectual sharing movement with translation, distribution, and donation of credits gained by their activities. SNOW is open to common users as volunteers to share and translate; it is now planning more services and improvements. 2,310 higher education contents are accessible. SNOW contains overall 240 Korean-script-supported lectures including 145 from TED 95 by users’ voluntary translations.

The Chung Young Yang Embroidery Museum 
The Chung Young Yang Embroidery Museum at Sookmyung Women’s University is an exhibition, educational, and research facility dedicated to advancing the knowledge and appreciation of embroidery and textile arts. Inaugurated in May 2004, the museum houses an extensive collection of embroidered and woven textiles representing various periods and regions.

The museum’s permanent collection, primarily focused on East Asian costume and decorative arts, is among the most comprehensive of its kind in Asia. Its wide scope illuminates the cross-cultural dialogues in technique and style that have enriched textile arts. Through exhibition and education efforts, the museum seeks to highlight the technical and artistic achievement of embroiderers across time and place; expand understanding of the social and cultural roles that textiles have fulfilled globally; and establish the art of embroidery as a significant contribution to world culture. Housed in a new building that includes exhibition galleries, an information center, a library, conservation studios, classrooms, and a 300-seat auditorium equipped with earphones for simultaneous translation, the museum aims to become a leading center for scholarship in embroidery and other textile arts.

The collection 
The permanent collection of the Chung Young Yang Embroidery Museum includes votive textiles, ecclesiastical robes, military uniforms, folding screens, wedding garments, chair and table coverings, rank insignia, and various types of clothing, costume accessories, and household furnishings used by all social classes. The collection encompasses a broad range of examples from around the world as well as replicas of extant ancient artifacts. The museum seeks to encourage the examination of embroidered textiles as primary documents of the technological, social, and cultural environments that produced them as well as to emphasize embroidery’s position as an important cultural inheritance and an expressive, dynamic, and continually evolving art form.

Controversy 

In 2012, Sookymung University's board was involved in a scandal involving alleged money "laundering". Specifically, according to the school's internal laws, the university's board is obliged to make financial contributions to the operational budget of the school through a foundation. However, when the school received a total of 68.5 billion won ($61 million) in donations from 1995 to 2009, the university's board placed these donations in a foundation account and then transferred them to a school administration account, making it appear as if it was the foundation which made a financial contribution to the school's management. Excluding these 'donations', the foundation made no contribution of its own to school administration. As a consequence, from 1995 to 2009 Sookmyung University students paid 5% more tuition fee than they otherwise would have had to do.

In 2020, Sookmyung Women's University became the first Korean women's university to admit a trans student; however, the student later withdrew her acceptance after news of her acceptance sparked controversy.

Notable people 
Moon Hee-kyung, actress

See also
Sookmyung Gayageum Orchestra
Sookmyung Girls' High School
Asian Women, academic journal of the Research Institute of Asian Women (RIAW) based at Sookmyung Women's University

References

External links
The official website
The official English website
Sookmyung Network to Open World
SNOW (Sookmyung Network to Open World)

 
Yongsan District
Universities and colleges in Seoul
Women's universities and colleges in South Korea
Private universities and colleges in South Korea
Educational institutions established in 1906
1906 establishments in Korea